Seven ships of the Royal Navy have borne the name HMS Onyx, after the mineral Onyx. Another was renamed before being launched:

  was a 10-gun  launched in 1808 and sold in 1819.
  was a 10-gun Cherokee-class brig-sloop launched in 1822 and sold in 1837.
  was an iron paddle packet launched in 1845 and sold in 1854.
  was a  wooden screw gunboat launched in 1856. She became a dockyard craft in 1869 and was broken up in 1873. 
  was an  launched in 1892. She became a depot ship in 1907 and was renamed HMS Vulcan II in 1919. She was sold in 1924.
  was an  launched in 1942 and scrapped in 1967.
She was transferred to the Royal Canadian Navy and renamed  before her launch in 1964. 
  was an Oberon-class submarine launched in 1967. She was decommissioned in 1990 and handed over to the Warship Preservation Trust in 1991.

Royal Navy ship names